Brandy AKA Ride and Kill is a 1964 Spanish/Italian western film directed by José Luis Borau and Mario Caiano, composed by Riz Ortolani and starring Alex Nicol, Roberto Undari and Renzo Palmer. It is the film debut of Mario Caiano.

Cast

References

External links
 

1964 Western (genre) films
1964 films
Spanish Western (genre) films
Italian Western (genre) films
Spaghetti Western films
Films directed by José Luis Borau
Films directed by Mario Caiano
Films scored by Riz Ortolani
Paramount Pictures films
Something Weird Video
Films based on short fiction
1960s Italian films